The Marsh Award for Excellence in Public Sculpture is an annual award for public sculpture in the UK or Ireland.

The Award is funded by the Marsh Charitable Trust and is made on the recommendation of a panel of judges under the auspices of the Public Statues and Sculpture Association (PSSA), formerly the Public Monuments and Sculpture Association (PMSA).

Scope and ceremonies 
The award is generally made to a work of new sculpture, which has to be erected in a place accessible to the public. However awards have also been made to restorations of historic sculpture and in 2011 an award was made to the town of Harlow in Essex for its work in creating an environment for sculpture in the town and promoting this as Harlow Sculpture Town.

The Award Ceremony is held annually at the PMSA headquarters in Cowcross Street, London, every November, although in 2009 it was held at the Whitechapel Art Gallery, when it was presented by Boris Johnson.

The PMSA also organises a biennial award for public fountains in association with the Marsh Christian Trust. The Trust also organises other awards in arts, heritage, conservation and the environment and social welfare, with other organisations.

Past winners 

Winners of the Marsh Award for Public Sculpture include:

 2006: Maggi Hambling for Scallop
 2006: Jim Hurley & his team for restoration of the Sheffield Cholera Monument
 2007: Bryan Kneale RA, for Capt Quilliam
 2007: James Turrell for Deer Shelter Skyspace (at Yorkshire Sculpture Park)
 2008: SI Applied Ltd for Cutting Edge, Sheffield, Yorkshire
 2008: Ian Rank-Broadley for the Armed Forces Memorial
 2009: Jaume Plensa  for Dream
 2010: Peter W. Naylor for the Memorial to 158 Squadron
 2011: Andrew Sabin for The Coldstones Cut
 2011: Harlow Art Trust, for Harlow Sculpture Town
 2012: Gordon Young for Comedy Carpet
 2012: Carmody Groarke for Indian Ocean Tsunami Memorial
 2013: Philip Jackson for the RAF Bomber Command Memorial
 2014: Richard Wilson for Slipstream
 2015: Antony Gormley for Room
 2015: Douglas Jennings for Squadron Leader Mahinder Singh Puji DFC
 2016: David Nash for Habitat
 2017: Martin Jennings for Women of Steel
 2017: Rodney Harris and Valda Jackson for Four Brick Reliefs
 2018: Martin Jennings for George Orwell
 2021: Hazel Reeves for Our Emmeline
 2022: Veronica Ryan for Caribbean Fruits

Notes

External links 

 

Sculpture awards